Vril Dox, also known as Brainiac 2, is a fictional character published by DC Comics. He first appeared in Superman #167 (February 1964), and was created by Edmond Hamilton, Cary Bates, and Curt Swan.

Publication history
He is the heir of Brainiac, one of Superman's greatest foes. He is an ancestor of Querl Dox, Brainiac 5 of the Legion of Super-Heroes. Vril Dox first appeared in Superman #167 (February 1964), by Edmond Hamilton, Cary Bates, and Curt Swan, in a story entitled "The Deadly Duo! - The Team of Luthor and Brainiac!". He was later resurrected in Invasion! #1 (January 1989), by Keith Giffen, Bill Mantlo, and Todd McFarlane. However, rather than being the adopted son of Brainiac, due to changes in Post-Crisis continuity, he is now a clone of Brainiac.

He went on to star in L.E.G.I.O.N. '89 (February 1989) through L.E.G.I.O.N. '94 (September 1994) by Keith Giffen, Alan Grant, and Barry Kitson. He returned in the follow-up series R.E.B.E.L.S. '94 (October 1994) through R.E.B.E.L.S. '96 (March 1996) by Tom Peyer and Arnie Jorgensen, and the subsequent series R.E.B.E.L.S. (2009–2011).

Fictional character biography

Silver Age
Vril Dox was a young Coluan who was adopted by the Computer Tyrants of Colu and declared Brainiac's son (Brainiac 2). He escaped and led a rebellion against the Computer Tyrants which overthrew their rule. He later appeared briefly in the Secrets of the Legion of Super-Heroes miniseries. His descendants (who had inherited long Coluan lifespans) were his son Pran Dox (Brainiac 3), his grandson Kajz Dox (Brainiac 4) and ultimately his great-grandson Querl Dox, Brainiac 5 of the Legion of Super Heroes.

Post-Crisis

Invasion!

Vril Dox II is a now a clone of Vril Dox (Brainiac), rather than his adopted son, as he is created by Vril Dox himself. He is still regarded as Brainiac's "heir", as he has inherited the original's high intelligence and Machiavellian ethics.

L.E.G.I.O.N. '89-94

Vril Dox is the founder of the interplanetary police force Licensed Extra Governmental Interstellar Operatives Network (abbreviated as L.E.G.I.O.N., an acronym suggested by Strata but accepted by Dox). It was founded through outright murder when Vril and his allies destroyed a criminal drug ring. Chief Dox tries to manipulate everyone he came across, not generally accepting when they did not follow his plans. He manages to gain control of the bounty hunter Lobo. This is partly by outsmarting and outfighting Lobo and taking advantage of one of the bounty hunter's simple ethics; that he never breaks his word.

Vril leads the Earth's heroes in the 1992 Annual crossover, they travel to the moon and defeat the Eclipso entity.

R.E.B.E.L.S. '94-96

Vril had a son named Lyrl Dox (Brainiac 3) who rebelled and took over his organization. Vril later regains control of L.E.G.I.O.N by bartering with the demon Neron. The deal is for the soul of one of his unborn offspring.  After the cancellation of the title, he would only occasionally appear in the more cosmic DCU titles. For example, he appears in the 2004 Adam Strange miniseries, using robotic soldiers to hunt Strange. Dox, now missing his hair, incorrectly believes Rann had been destroyed at the hands of Strange. Dox's forces assist in the limited series Infinite Crisis.

R.E.B.E.L.S. (2009–2011)
A new 2009 series features Starro the Conqueror taking control of a now completely automated L.E.G.I.O.N. Dox, along with his old compatriot, Strata, must form a new team to regain his former status. During the Blackest Night crossover, Dox comes into contact with the mother of his son, who had recently been killed by L.E.G.I.O.N. drones, and was subsequently revived as a Black Lantern. Dox was also in an area in which a Sinestro Corps member was murdered by another Black Lantern. When the ring started to search for a new host, it selected Dox, making him a member of the Sinestro Corps. However, not even the power of the ring was a match for the Black Lanterns, forcing Dox to teleport them to Starro's homeworld, despite the fact that his son, Lyrl (who had recently had his intelligence restored by the warlord) was there also. Soon after, the ring rejected Dox, who had repeatedly refused Sinestro's mandate that all members of the Sinestro Corps were to gather at Korugar, and declared that he had been discharged from the Corps.

R.E.B.E.L.S. helped to save the Vega system and several galaxies by defeating Starro the Conqueror. The plight of Rann's people was soon resolved by Vril Dox, seeking to restore his reputation after Starro the Conqueror stole L.E.G.I.O.N. from him and used it to enslave its client worlds. Dox Zeta-beamed Rann into the Vega system, in the orbit previously held by the now destroyed planet Tamaran, and proceeded to terraform Rann and make it suitable to sustain life again.

The restoration of the planet Rann was not Dox's only reason for relocating it into the Vega system. First, by putting Rann into Tamaran's orbit, it restored the gravitational balance to the Vega system, which had been thrown off by Tamaran's destruction. Secondly, in exchange for restoring their planet, the people of Rann agreed to let Dox rebuild L.E.G.I.O.N. headquarters on Rann.

Tamaranian refugees, led by Blackfire, attacked Rann believing that since the planet was in Tamaran's orbit they had claim to it. The violence was ended when Vril Dox, who was off-world at the start of the conflict, arrived with Thanagarian warships and stopped the fighting without bloodshed on either side. As it turned out, Dox was off-world negotiating an official end to the Rann-Thanagar War, using Rann's new-found distance from Thanagar and change in leadership on both sides as leverage.

Dox then went on to mediate the tension between the Rannians and the Tamaranians by proposing that the Tamaranians live on Rann's uninhabited southern continent.

Dox, Adam Strange and other senior commanders of L.E.G.I.O.N. also ensured peace with the Green Lantern Corps and helped create an alliance between Rannians, Tamaranians and L.E.G.I.O.N. after defeating Starro the Conqueror, ensuring security for Rann, the Vega system and the galaxy, with Dox becoming consort to Blackfire.

The New 52
In 2011, "The New 52" rebooted the DC universe. In Superman vol. 3 Annual #2 Vril Dox is shown to be Brainiac's original identity.

Rebirth
In 2016, DC Comics implemented another relaunch of its books called "DC Rebirth", which restored its continuity to a form much as it was prior to "The New 52". When Brainiac's home planet of Colu falls under the threat of four beings that escaped the Source Wall at the end of Dark Nights: Metal, the teams of heroes and villains realize that their armor is pulling them into four teams towards four different energy sources in the form of trees that coincide with the four entities. Batman's team finds Vril Dox, who claims that his father would never put his faith in the Earth heroes, as he only needed their powers to save Colu, but his plan required him at every step. With Brainiac's death at the hands of Amanda Waller, the planet of Colu and Earth are doomed.

Other versions
Vril is visited by the time-traveling entity named Waverider, a man on a mission to see which modern-day heroic figure might become a tyrant in ten years' time. This is part of the Armageddon 2001 crossover. Vril captures Waverider and does see his future. Due to power gained by ten years of Waverider's capture, Vril has become a tyrant, killing many innocents. Horrified at this, Vril lets Waverider go so that this future will not come to pass.

He appeared in the new digital first comic book Adventures of Supergirl series on January 24, 2016, which ties-in to the CBS/CW Supergirl TV series.

In other media
 Vril Dox was set to appear as a playable character in Ocean Software's cancelled Lobo fighting game for the Super Nintendo Entertainment System and the Sega Genesis.
 Vril Dox appears in the first issue of DC Universe Online: Legends.
 Vril Dox appears in Legion of Super-Heroes (2023), voiced by Benjamin Diskin.

Notes

References

External links
Cosmic Teams: Vril Dox II 
DCU Guide: Vril Dox II

Characters created by Cary Bates
Characters created by Curt Swan
Characters created by Edmond Hamilton
Comics characters introduced in 1964
DC Comics aliens
DC Comics extraterrestrial superheroes
DC Comics male superheroes
DC Comics extraterrestrial supervillains
DC Comics male supervillains
DC Comics orphans
DC Comics robots
DC Comics cyborgs
Cyborg supervillains
Robot supervillains
Cyborg superheroes
Robot superheroes
Fictional androids
Fictional artificial intelligences
Fictional characters who have made pacts with devils
Fictional extraterrestrial cyborgs
Fictional extraterrestrial robots
Fictional gynoids
Fictional technopaths
Clone characters in comics
Superheroes who are adopted